Aerospace Data Facility-East (ADF-E), also known as Area 58 and formerly known as Defense Communications Electronics Evaluation and Testing Activity (DCEETA), is one of three satellite ground stations operated by the National Reconnaissance Office (NRO) in the continental United States. Located within Fort Belvoir, Virginia, the facility is responsible for the command and control of reconnaissance satellites involved in the collection of intelligence information and for the dissemination of that intelligence to other U.S. government agencies.

Function 
ADF East is co-located with elements of the National Geospatial-Intelligence Agency, the agency responsible for the operation of the U.S. space-based imagery constellation. Authors James Bamford and Jeffrey Richelson report that the site manages the KH-11 imagery spacecraft and the Lacrosse radar imaging spacecraft.

History

First use 
The first documented use of material downloaded at ADF East was on January 21, 1977, when the acting director of Central Intelligence E. Henry Knoche delivered reconnaissance satellite photographs that had been downloaded at ADF East to U.S. President Jimmy Carter.

Y2K 
On the morning of January 1, 2000, ADF East experienced a technical glitch caused by the Y2K bug, which resulted in the facility being temporarily unable to capture any more than 70 percent of its planned imagery satellite coverage. At a press conference on January 4, United States Deputy Secretary of Defense John Hamre stated, "The problem wasn't with the satellite system – they were under positive control at all times. The problem was on the ground in the processing station."

Declassification 

On October 15, 2008, the NRO declassified its three Mission Ground Stations: ADF-East, ADF-Colorado, and ADF-Southwest. The term "Area 58" is still classified, however, with the exception of very general associations with the NRO, intelligence activities, imagery intelligence, or satellite reconnaissance.

List of commanders

 Col B. Edwin Wilson, September 2006 – April 2008
 Col Robert J. Bonner

See also
 Aerospace Data Facility-Colorado
 Aerospace Data Facility-Southwest
 Pine Gap
 RAF Menwith Hill
 Spy satellite

References

Further reading

Buildings and structures in Fairfax County, Virginia
National Reconnaissance Office
National Geospatial-Intelligence Agency
Installations of the U.S. Department of Defense
1977 establishments in Virginia